Paul Sérieux (1864–1947) was a French psychiatrist who was a native of Paris.

He practiced medicine in several French hospitals and asylums during his career, including the Asylum of Ville-Evrard and the hospital of Sainte-Anne. He also worked as a physician at the Asylum of Marsens in Switzerland.

Sérieux is best known for research of psychoses and delusional thought processes, and his collaborative work with Joseph Capgras (1873–1950). With Capgras, he described a type of non-schizophrenic, paranoid psychosis called délire d’interprétation, which is defined as a "chronic interpretive psychosis". Sérieux was also instrumental in introducing the theories of German psychiatrist Emil Kraepelin (1856–1926) into French psychiatry.

With his one-time mentor Valentin Magnan (1835–1916), he co-authored the book Le délire chronique a evolution systématique (1892), and in 1909 with Capgras, he published a treatise called Les folies raisonnantes. Sérieux traveled widely throughout Europe, and created an extensive report on the state and conditions of psychiatric treatment in French, German, Swiss and Belgian mental asylums.

References 
1904. L'Année Psychologique.,10, 532 : Paul Sérieux, 1903, Clinique psychiatrique de l’Université de Giessen (Grand Duché de Hesse), Arch. de neurologie, juillet, p. 15-31. 
 This article is based on a translation of an article from the French Wikipedia.

External links 
 Le délire érotique at Psychanalyse-Paris.com
 Instruction sur la manière de gouverner les Insensés

French psychiatrists
1864 births
1947 deaths
Physicians from Paris